Jon Persson (born 31 May 1976) is a Swedish former professional footballer who played as a defender. Persson made 33 Allsvenskan appearances for IF Brommapojkarna and scored five goals.

References

1976 births
Living people
Association football defenders
Swedish footballers
Allsvenskan players
Djurgårdens IF Fotboll players
IF Brommapojkarna players